West Hills College Coalinga is a public community college in Coalinga, California, with a satellite facility in Firebaugh. Both locations serve students in the central San Joaquin Valley. Established in 1932, West Hills College Coaling is in the West Hills Community College District. It is accredited by the Accrediting Commission for Community and Junior Colleges.

Academics
The school is one of only eleven California community colleges with dormitories in the U.S. It attracts students from around the world, and actively recruits students from other countries to enroll in its English as a Second Language program.

West Hills College Coalinga athletics offers football, baseball, and basketball for men; and volleyball and softball for women.  A coed top-ranked rodeo team competes against two and four year schools. Other sports programs are being added.

References

External links
 Official website

California Community Colleges
Universities and colleges in Fresno County, California
Coalinga, California
Two-year colleges in the United States
Educational institutions established in 1932
1932 establishments in California
Schools accredited by the Western Association of Schools and Colleges